3-Aminopyridine-2-carboxaldehyde thiosemicarbazone (3-AP, also called Triapine) is a substance that is being studied in the treatment of cancer.

It belongs to the family of drugs called ribonucleotide reductase inhibitors.

3AP is a potent inhibitor of ribonucleotide reductase, the rate determining enzyme in the supply of deoxynucleotides  (DNA building blocks) for DNA synthesis. DNA synthesis is required for cellular proliferation and DNA repair. It is a very strong iron chelator and in the body it is likely that the iron chelate is the active species that quenches the active site tyrosyl radical required by ribonucleotide reductase for its enzymatic activity. The 3AP iron chelate is redox active and there have been several reports in the literature ascribing this property to some of the biological activities of 3AP. 3AP was chosen, based on the results of studying and the screening these products, as the candidate inhibitor most likely to express activity in the setting of human neoplastic disease.  Vion Pharmaceuticals has also filed several use patents concerning the antiviral and antifungal activity of 3AP.

3AP was initially developed by Vion Pharmaceuticals until company declared bankruptcy in December 2009. Nanotherapeutics, Inc. acquired the product from bankruptcy in 2010 and supported trials at NCI until 2018 when the product was transferred to Nanoshift, LLC. Nanoshift LLC and Nanopharmaceutics, Inc. continue to support clinical studies with the NCI.

References

External links
 NCT02466971 Testing the Addition of a New Anti-Cancer Drug, Triapine, to the Usual Chemotherapy Treatment (Cisplatin) During Radiation Therapy for Advanced-stage Cervical and Vaginal Cancers
 NCT02595879 Triapine With Chemotherapy and Radiation Therapy in Treating Patients With IB2-IVA Cervical or Vaginal Cancer
 NCT04234568 Testing the Addition of an Anti-cancer Drug, Triapine, to the Usual Radiation-Based Treatment (Lutetium Lu 177 Dotatate) for Neuroendocrine Tumors
 NCT04494113 Testing the Response to the Anti-cancer Drug, Triapine, in Uterine Cancers Using Markers From the Tissue at the Time of Hysterectomy

Experimental cancer drugs
Thiosemicarbazone
Aminopyridines